John Mace (28 December 1828 – 30 April 1905). He was an English-born cricketer who played for Victoria and Otago. Mace played twice at a level later classified as first-class cricket, one each for Victoria and Otago.

See also
 List of Victoria first-class cricketers
 List of Otago representative cricketers

References

External links 
  from Cricinfo.

1828 births
1905 deaths
Australian cricketers
Otago cricketers
Victoria cricketers
English cricketers